D. Rajendra Babu (30 March 1951 – 3 November 2013) was an Indian filmmaker and screenplay writer in Kannada cinema. He has directed over 50 films in various genres, most of them being sentimental films. He wrote and directed numerous blockbuster films, though many of them are re-makes. Apart from Kannada films, he directed a Malayalam and a Hindi film each. He is considered one of the most revered directors of the Kannada film industry.

Some of the notable works of Babu are Nanu Nanna Hendathi (1985), Olavina Udugore (1987), Ramachaari (1991), Ramarajyadalli Rakshasaru (1990), Halunda Thavaru (1994), Appaji (1996), Diggajaru (2000), Amma (2001), Encounter Dayanayak (2005) and Bindaas (2010).

Early career
Babu joined the Kannada film industry in the early 1980s as an actor, but later on became a filmmaker. He worked as an associate to many top directors such as Rajendra Singh Babu, K. S. R. Das and V. Somashekhar.

Babu became an independent director with Jiddu, starring Tiger Prabhakar and Jayamala. Though the film was not a big success, his subsequent films such as Swabhimaana and Naanu Nanna Hendthi were massive silver jubilee hits. He has so far directed 50 films including a Hindi film, Pyaar Karke Dekho (1987).

Personal life
Babu was married to Sumithra, a multi-lingual actress. They have two daughters – Umashankari and Nakshatra. Nakshatra has made her acting debut in a Tamil film Doo.

Death
Babu was admitted to M. S. Ramaiah Hospital on 2 November 2013 after he complained of abdominal pain. He died of a heart attack in the hospital on the morning of 3 November.

Filmography

Awards and honors
 2011 – Karnataka State Award for Lifetime Achievement.
 2012 – Puttanna Kanagal Award for Outstanding contribution in Kannada cinema.

References

External links
 D. Rajednra Babu demise: Oneindia Kannada
 

1951 births
2013 deaths
Hindi-language film directors
Kannada film directors
Malayalam film directors
Kannada screenwriters
20th-century Indian film directors
21st-century Indian film directors
Film directors from Bangalore
Screenwriters from Bangalore
20th-century Indian dramatists and playwrights
21st-century Indian dramatists and playwrights